Tina Mahon (born 24 June 1971 in London, England) is a former teenage actress, best known for her long-term role as Veronica "Ronnie" Birtles in the long-running BBC school drama, Grange Hill. A series regular from 1985 to 1990, Mahon made one final cameo in 1991. Tina then appeared in one episode of ITV's The Bill filmed in late summer 1990, but seemingly left acting thereafter. During the 90s she was the romantic partner of fellow Grange Hill co-star John Alford, and was at his side during his trial and brief imprisonment in 1999. Tina is reported to work in admin at a North London college at present.

References

External links

1971 births
Living people
British television actresses